Sub-Zero is an American brand of residential major kitchen appliances including refrigeration and wine preservation products built in the USA by the Sub-Zero Group, Inc. based in Madison, Wisconsin. The company also manufactures kitchen appliances under the Wolf brand name, and dishwashers under the Cove brand name.

History 

The Sub-Zero Freezer Company was founded in August 20 1945, by Westye F. Bakke in Madison, Wisconsin. In 2000, it acquired the domestic appliance line of the Wolf Range Corporation, a California-based manufacturer of professional-style ranges, cooktops and grills for both home and commercial use.

Wolf Appliance Inc., Sub-Zero's corporate companion, expanded the few products acquired from Wolf Range Corporation. It now sells domestic cooking appliances from kitchen stoves, cooktops, wall ovens, warming drawers and ventilation equipment. The company's products compete with those made by Viking, Dacor, Thermador, GE Monogram, KitchenAid, JennAir and Miele.

Innovations
According to the official company history, Bakke invented the first free-standing freezer in 1943. It also claims to have been the first to manufacture built-in refrigerators, beginning in the 1950s,.

Sub-Zero's wine storage refrigeration can be connected to a household security system. This feature is intended for those with substantial sums invested in their wine collections.

Appliance models

Sub-Zero manufactures two series of built-in refrigeration as well as wine storage and under counter units. Each refrigerator model usually comes in two variations, namely a stainless steel exterior or a customizable exterior in an overlay or flush inset version.  The customizable option allows the buyer to install kitchen cabinet panels on the door(s) to match with the rest of the kitchen. Its refrigerators are designed with a  depth and can be installed flush with kitchen cabinets of the same standard depth to provide an integrated look. 

The Sub-Zero 424 Wine Cooler has held virtually the same design since the early 1990s. It has two temperature zones and can be connected to a house alarm.

The company has production facilities in Madison, Wisconsin; Phoenix, Arizona; Goodyear, Arizona; Richmond, Kentucky; and Fitchburg, Wisconsin and a forthcoming 400,000 ft² facility in Cedar Rapids, Iowa scheduled to open in 2025.

References

External links
 

Home appliance brands
Home appliance manufacturers of the United States
Companies based in Madison, Wisconsin
Manufacturing companies established in 1945
Privately held companies based in Wisconsin
Luxury brands
Refrigerators